Stefan Mitrović (born 29 March 1988) is a Serbian water polo center back for Partizan. He was a member of the Serbia men's national water polo teams that won a bronze medal at the 2012 Olympics and gold medals in 2016 and 2020. He was pulled out of the 2008 Beijing Olympics team after suffering injuries in a motorcycle accident. He won the world title in 2009 and 2015 and the European title in 2012, 2014, 2016 and 2018.

Club career

Partizan Raiffeisen
On 22 October 2011. Mitrović scored three goals in the first round of the Euroleague Group, in an 8–9 loss to Szeged Beton VE. On 26 November Mitrović scored a goal in a 9–6 Euroleague third round win over ZF Eger in Belgrade. Mitrović scored three goals on 14 December in the fourth round of the Euroleague, in the 12–8 second defeat to ZF Eger. On 8 February Stefan Mitrović scored a goal for Partizan in the fifth round of the Euroleague Group in which his team won without much problem 9–5 against TEVA-Vasas-UNIQA. On 15 February Mitrović scored his first goal of the Serbian National Championship season, in the second round of the "A League", in an 8–6 win against Crvena Zvezda VET. On 1 March Mitrović scored a goal against VK Vojvodina in a 10–9 win in the "A League" fourth round.

Szolnoki Dózsa-KÖZGÉP
Starting with the 2013–2014 season he played for Szolnoki Dózsa-KÖZGÉP. He was part of the team for three seasons, until 2016, winning the national championship in the last two out of the three occasions.

Ferencvárosi TC
Starting with the 2016–2017 season he will be playing for Ferencvárosi TC alongside other signings from his previous team such as Dániel Varga, Norbert Madaras and Márton Tóth.

Olympiacos
On 25 June 2019, he signed for Greek powerhouse Olympiacos.

National career
On 16 January, at the European Championship Mitrović scored a goal in the first game in an 8–5 win against Spain. Mitrović was a big part of his team on 19 January, in a big 15–12 victory against the defending European champions Croatia. He scored two goals for his team. On 27 January Mitrović scored two goals in a semifinal 12–8 victory over Italy. Stefan Mitrović won the 2012 European Championship on 29 January. He scored two goals alongside his captain Vanja Udovičić in the final against Montenegro which his national team won by 9–8. Later that year he won a bronze medal at the 2012 Olympics.

Honours
VK Partizan
LEN Champions League: 2010–11
Serbian Chanmpionship: 2006–07, 2007–08, 2008–09, 2009–10, 2010–11, 2011–12
Serbian Cup: 2006–07, 2007–08, 2008–09, 2009–10, 2010–11, 2011–12

Szolnoki
Hungarian Championship: 2014–15 , 2015–16
Hungarian Cup: 2014
Hungarian Super Cup: 2016

Ferencvaros
LEN Champions League: 2018–19
LEN Super Cup: 2018
LEN Euro Cup: 2016–17, 2017–18
Hungarian Championships: 2017–18, 2018–19
Hungarian Cup: 2018
Hungarian Super Cup: 2017, 2018

Olympiacos 
Greek Championship: 2019–20
Greek Cup: 2019–20
Greek Super Cup: 2019

Awards
 Hungarian Championship Top Scorer: 2013–14

Personal life
Mitrović is married to Ilinka.

See also
 Serbia men's Olympic water polo team records and statistics
 List of Olympic champions in men's water polo
 List of Olympic medalists in water polo (men)
 List of world champions in men's water polo
 List of World Aquatics Championships medalists in water polo

References

External links

 
 Stefan Mitrović at Water Polo Association of Serbia (archived)

1988 births
Living people
Sportspeople from Belgrade
Serbian male water polo players
Water polo drivers
Water polo players at the 2012 Summer Olympics
Water polo players at the 2016 Summer Olympics
Water polo players at the 2020 Summer Olympics
Medalists at the 2012 Summer Olympics
Medalists at the 2016 Summer Olympics
Medalists at the 2020 Summer Olympics
Olympic gold medalists for Serbia in water polo
Olympic bronze medalists for Serbia in water polo
World Aquatics Championships medalists in water polo
European champions for Serbia
Competitors at the 2009 Mediterranean Games
Mediterranean Games medalists in water polo
Mediterranean Games gold medalists for Serbia
Olympiacos Water Polo Club players
Serbian expatriate sportspeople in Hungary